Hearts and Minds is a British television series created by Jimmy McGovern and first aired on Channel 4 from 16 February to 9 March 1995. The series won the Royal Television Society award for Best Serial Drama.

The series is about a young teacher at a tough Liverpool high school. After working in a factory, Drew Mackenzie (Christopher Eccleston) manages to educate himself to become a teacher. He wants to share his idealistic approach to rising above his circumstances with his Liverpool students, but soon finds himself caught in the crossfire of racial tensions, homophobia, and the difficult home lives of the teenagers.
 
According to series creator Jimmy McGovern, the series was based in part on the three years he spent as an English teacher at the Quarry Bank school in Liverpool.  The series was well reviewed by British critics, who praised its realism as compared to other well known school dramas.

Cast

 Lynda Steadman as Emma Mackenzie
 Christopher Eccleston as Drew Mackenzie
 David Harewood as Trevor
 Ian McElhinney as Alex
 Sara Mair-Thomas as Mo
 Peter Halliday as Shotton
 Pauline Black as Joanna
 Jonathan Dow as Maurice
 Peter Armitage as Norman
 Mark Womack as Archie
 Ann Joseph as Maggie
 Trina Ali as Sahira
 Paul Fox as Tony
 John Brady as kid

References

External links

1995 British television series debuts
1995 British television series endings
1990s British workplace drama television series
Channel 4 television dramas
Television shows set in Liverpool
British high school television series
1990s British television miniseries
English-language television shows
Television series about educators
Television series by Fremantle (company)